"Take the Week Off" is a song recorded by Canadian country music artist Deric Ruttan. It was released in August 2013 as the first single from his fourth studio album, Take the Week Off. It peaked at number 66 on the Canadian Hot 100 in October 2013.

Music video
The music video premiered in August 2013. It was directed by Margaret Malandruccolo and filmed in Rome, Italy.

Chart performance
"Take the Week Off" debuted at number 66 on the Canadian Hot 100 for the week of October 5, 2013.

References

2013 songs
2013 singles
Deric Ruttan songs
Music videos directed by Margaret Malandruccolo
Universal Music Group singles
Songs written by Deric Ruttan
Songs written by Ryan Tyndell